The 2005 Hit convoy ambush was an ambush by Iraqi insurgents of a convoy that was carrying military supplies for U.S. forces. The convoy was escorted by private military contractors. The ambush ended with the death of all the contractors.

Ambush
On May 9, 2005, a supply convoy left the U.S. military air base at Al Asad, Iraq. The convoy was escorted by 12 Iraqi, 4 South African and 1 Japanese private military contractor. Almost immediately after they exited the base they were observed by Iraqi insurgents. The insurgents then prepared a well planned ambush for the convoy. While the vehicles were passing near the city of Hit, 170 kilometers (105 mi) northwest of Baghdad, the insurgents struck. The ambush was complex and well planned, incorporating the use of multiple improvised explosive devices, rocket propelled grenades, machine gun fire and small arms fire. The vehicles got stuck in the ambush and couldn't pull back. For several hours a fierce battle raged and by morning the convoy was decimated. U.S. military helicopters arrived at the scene only after dawn broke. Insurgent propaganda footage showed burning trucks and SUV's with bodies littering the streets. 16 of the 17 security contractors were killed and the Japanese man was seriously wounded and captured. Insurgent casualties, if any, were unknown.

Aftermath
Following the attack there was much confusion over what really happened, but the only thing definitely confirmed was that a Japanese security contractor was wounded and captured in the attack.

Akihiko Saito was seriously wounded in the attack and captured by the insurgents. This raised the public debate in Japan to new heights whether Japanese troops should stay in Iraq or leave. Saito had been in the Japanese military until 1981, when he left the Japanese Self-Defense Forces and joined the French Foreign Legion. He had been working with Hart Security Ltd. as a security specialist at the time of his capture.

The militants tried to provide him with medical aid but it was not enough. It was reported on May 12 that he had died of his wounds.

They were not all killed.  A South African made his way to a combat outpost called the B/U split.  From there Marines mounted tracks and went to the ambush site.  It was still light out when we mounted the tracks.  There were no insurgents on site, but we disarmed another IED that was left under one of the bodies, and collected all of the KIA's.  We did go back in the morning again to see if we could gather anymore intel and to set a counter ambush once we pulled out. One Iraqi truck driver escaped and picked up one of Hart Security's Iraqi personnel making his way back to the Abu Ghraib Distribution center. Later debriefings at the Distribution center established that Akihiko Saito was killed by a bullet to the back of his head while attempting to fight his way out of the ambush.

References

Mass murder in 2005
Battles of the Iraq War in 2005
Iraqi insurgency (2003–2011)
May 2005 events in Iraq